Caplacizumab (INN; trade name Cablivi) is a bivalent single-domain antibody (VHH) designed for the treatment of thrombotic thrombocytopenic purpura (TTP) and thrombosis.

This drug was developed by Ablynx NV. On 30 August 2018, it was approved in the European Union for the "treatment of adults experiencing an episode of acquired thrombotic thrombocytopenic purpura (aTTP), in conjunction with plasma exchange and immunosuppression".

It is an anti-von Willebrand factor humanized immunoglobulin. It acts by blocking platelet aggregation to reduce organ injury due to ischemia.  Results of the phase II TITAN trial have been reported.

In February 2019, caplacizumab-yhdp (Cablivi, Ablynx NV) was approved in the United States for the treatment of adults with acquired thrombotic thrombocytopenic purpura (aTTP). The drug is used in combination with plasma exchange and immunosuppressive therapy. The U.S. Food and Drug Administration (FDA) considers it to be a first-in-class medication.

References

External links
 

Monoclonal antibodies
Sanofi
Orphan drugs